Maurizio Neri (born 21 March 1965 in Rimini) is an Italian professional football coach and a former player who played as a striker.

Currently, he is the head coach of Real Rimini.

Honours
Napoli
 UEFA Cup winner: 1988–89.

1965 births
Living people
Italian footballers
Serie A players
Serie B players
Serie C players
Alma Juventus Fano 1906 players
A.C. Reggiana 1919 players
A.C. Ancona players
A.C. Bellaria Igea Marina players
S.S.C. Napoli players
Pisa S.C. players
S.S. Lazio players
Brescia Calcio players
Rimini F.C. 1912 players
Italian football managers
A.C. Bellaria Igea Marina managers
UEFA Cup winning players
Association football forwards